Christof Jantzen is an architect based in Los Angeles, California. Throughout his professional career Jantzen has directed and designed various sustainably designed projects. Many have received international recognition for leadership in global green design including the Santa Monica Parking Structure #6, the Genzyme Corporate Headquarters, Mill Street Lofts, Los Angeles and the Harvard Allston Science Complex. Other recognition of Jantzens’s work includes the Leadership in Energy and Environmental Design (LEED) Platinum Award, AIA/COTE Top Ten Green Project Award, California Green Leadership Award, Northeast Sustainable Energy Association Award, American Architecture Award… Jantzen was the founding partner of Behnisch Architekten LLP in the United States. He is a professor at the University of Washington International Center for Advanced Renewable Energy and Sustainability I-CARES. Jantzen taught design at the Southern California Institute of Architecture, California State Polytechnic University and the University of Southern California. He is the principal and owner of the Venice, California -based architectural practice Studio Jantzen.

Buildings & projects
 Santa Monica Parking Structure #6, Santa Monica, CA
 Anna Head Student Housing Complex, UC Berkeley, CA
 Genzyme Corporate Headquarters, Cambridge, MA 
 Park Street Laboratory Building, Yale University, New Haven, CT
 Harvard Allston Science Complex, Harvard University, Boston, MA
 Mill Street Lofts, Los Angeles, CA
 The House of the Future, Illinois Institute of Technology, Chicago, IL
 French Lofts, Los Angeles, CA
 Mineral Bath Extension & Renovation, Bad Elster, Germany
 Lower Donlands Urban Estuary, Toronto, ON
 The Hearn Power Station Regeneration Project, Toronto, ON
 Retrofit of The Daley Center Chicago in Cooperation with Chicago Mayor Richard M. Daley
 CityArchRiver St. Loius
 Innovative Container Residence
 Deming Place Chicago
 Kelly Pool House Brentwood, CA
 CTCSE Connecticut Center for Science & Exploration, USA-Hartford 
 Artcenter Passedena
 Re:Vision Dallas Central Dallas Community Development Corporation (CDCDC), TX

Academics
 Professor at the University of Washington International Center for Advanced Renewable Energy and Sustainability I-CARES
 Taught design at the Southern California Institute of Architecture
 Taught design at the California State Polytechnic University
 Taught at University of Southern California
 Assistant Professor for Design at the University of Stuttgart
 Lectured at the University of Auburn’s Rural Design Studio in Alabama
 Lectured at the Conell University
 Lectured University of Utah College of Architecture and Planning

References 

Architecture educators
Year of birth missing (living people)
Living people
Architects from Los Angeles

External links 
 Official Website Studio Jantzen